Tuoba laticeps is a species of centipede in the Geophilidae family. It is endemic to Australia, and was first described in 1891 by British zoologist Reginald Innes Pocock.

Description
This species is orange yellow throughout and can reach up to 23 mm in length. Males of this species have 43 to 59 pairs of legs; females have 45 to 59 leg pairs.

Distribution
The species occurs in Western Australia and Tasmania. The type locality is King Island in Bass Strait.

Behaviour
The centipedes are solitary terrestrial predators that inhabit plant litter, soil and rotting wood.

References

 

 
laticeps
Centipedes of Australia
Endemic fauna of Australia
Fauna of Tasmania
Fauna of Western Australia
Animals described in 1891
Taxa named by R. I. Pocock